Alexa Avilés is an American politician, community activist, and non-profit manager from New York City. She is a member of the New York City Council for the 38th district, which covers Sunset Park along Brooklyn's western shoreline, also covering Red Hook, Greenwood Heights, and small parts of Windsor Terrace, Dyker Heights, and Borough Park neighborhoods in western Brooklyn.

Prior to taking office, Avilés worked in the non-profit sector, served as president of a parent-teacher association and a member of Brooklyn Community Board 7.

Early life and education
Avilés was born in Bayamón, Puerto Rico, and raised in East New York. She was the youngest of seven children to a substance abuse counselor mother, and the first in her family to attend college. She graduated Columbia University in 1995, and received a master's degree from CUNY's Baruch College School of Public and International Affairs. She is a National Urban Fellow and an alumna of A Better Chance.

Career
Her first job began as internship in college and then continued after graduation, at a philanthropy that provided environmental grants in under-served communities in Mississippi, and from there she branched out to work in reproductive rights and justice drives for native communities. She later worked for the Justice, Equality, Human dignity and Tolerance Foundation (JEHT), focused on mass incarceration issues as a program manage, focusing on juvenile decarceration. She also worked at the Fund of the Four Directions.

Avilés was a program officer and then program director at the Scherman Foundation from 2011 to 2021, working on advocacy for human rights, reproductive rights, and strengthening programs for the arts.

Elected office
In 2021, Avilés defeated five other candidates to win the Democratic nomination, prevailing over her closest opponent Yu Lin 65%-35%. in the fifth round of ranked choice voting. She received endorsements from U.S. Senator Bernie Sanders, Congressmembers Nydia Velázquez and Alexandria Ocasio-Cortez, State Senators Julia Salazar and Jabari Brisport, Assemblymember Marcela Mitaynes, the Working Families Party, United Federation of Teachers, District Council 37, and other local groups and elected officials. No Republican challenged her in the November 2021 general election, and Avilés won with over 80% of the vote. She took office in January 2022.

Personal life
She lives with her husband, Frankie, and her two daughters in Sunset Park, where she has lived since 2000.

Avilés is a board member of the Management Assistance Group, and serves on the Racial Justice Advisory Council of the Brooklyn Community Foundation. She is a member of Brooklyn Community Board 7 and serves as the president of the PS 172 parent-teacher association.

She is a member of the Democratic Socialists of America.

Election history

References

External links

21st-century American politicians
American politicians of Puerto Rican descent
Democratic Socialists of America politicians from New York
Hispanic and Latino American politicians
Hispanic and Latino American women in politics
Hispanic and Latino American New York City Council members
Columbia University alumni
Living people
New York (state) Democrats
New York (state) socialists
New York City Council members
People from Bayamón, Puerto Rico
People from Sunset Park, Brooklyn
Politicians from Brooklyn
21st-century American women politicians
Women New York City Council members
1973 births